Excede may refer to:

 Ceftiofur, a chemical compound
 Exoplanetary Circumstellar Environments and Disk Explorer, a planned space telescope